Bob Collins (25 December 1934 – 30 March 2018) was an Australian rules footballer who played with Footscray in the Victorian Football League (VFL).

Notes

External links 

1934 births
Australian rules footballers from Victoria (Australia)
Western Bulldogs players
2018 deaths
Place of birth missing
Place of death missing